Hibiscus moscheutos, the rose mallow, swamp rose-mallow, crimsoneyed rosemallow, or eastern rosemallow, is a species of flowering plant in the family Malvaceae. It is a cold-hardy perennial wetland plant that can grow in large colonies. The hirsute leaves are of variable morphology, but are commonly deltoidal in shape with up to three lobes. It is found in wetlands and along the riverine systems of the eastern United States from Texas to the Atlantic states, its territory extending northward to southern Ontario.

Numerous forms exist in nature. Petal colors range from pure white to deep rose, and most have an eye of deep maroon. Taxonomic consensus is lacking for the nomenclature of the multiple subspecies. The flowers are borne apically, whereas the related Hibiscus laevis carries bud and bloom along the stem.

Ecology
It is a larval host for the common checkered skipper, the gray hairstreak, the Io moth, and the pearly wood nymph.

Cultivation
This is a popular garden plant. It can be propagated by seed, or by crown divisions during winter dormancy, and some success can be achieved by hard-wood stem cuttings. Numerous hybrids of the native North American Hibiscus species have been released by the commercial nursery trade. In cultivation the species or the hybrids can be used in bog gardens or other water features. They are attractive and have wildlife value for nectar-feeders and birds.

Cultivars

Many cold-hardy hibiscus cultivars are hybrids of H. moscheutos, H. coccineus, H. laevis, H. militaris, H. grandiflorus, H. dasycalyx, H. mutabilis. With indeterminate genetic contributions from each parent species. Hibiscus breeders do not preclude the possibility of self-pollination. However, recent research has shown that artificial pollination just after the flower has opened using a high pollen load will ensure that most of the resulting seeds are from the selected pollen parent. Early hibiscus breeders were likely aware of this and used it to their advantage.

Conservation
In Canada this plant is listed as a species of special concern under the Species at Risk Act.

Gallery

References

moscheutos
Garden plants
Salt marsh plants
Flora of Canada
Flora of the Eastern United States
Plants described in 1753
Taxa named by Carl Linnaeus